A Wonderful Cloud is a 2015 American romantic comedy film written and directed by Eugene Kotlyarenko and starring Kate Lyn Sheil and Kotlyarenko.

Cast
Eugene Kotlyarenko
Kate Lyn Sheil
John Ennis
Vishwam Velandy
Rachel Lord
Lauren Avery
Niko Karamyan
Tierney Finster
Elisha Drons

Release
The film premiered at South by Southwest on March 15, 2015.  FilmBuff acquired American distribution rights to the film in October 2015.  The film was released in select theaters and on VOD on October 23, 2015.

Reception
Nikola Grozdanovic of IndieWire graded the film a B.  Ronnie Scheib of Variety gave the film a positive review and wrote, "Filmmaker Eugene Kotlyareno and his real-life ex Kate Lyn Sheil play out a dysfunctional L.A. reunion in this raucous, freewheeling comedy."

References

External links
 
 

2015 films
American romantic comedy films
2015 romantic comedy films
2010s English-language films
2010s American films